The  opened in Tottori, Japan, in 2000 and is dedicated to the history of the city.

See also

 Tottori Folk Crafts Museum

References

External links
  Tottori City Historical Museum

History museums in Japan
Museums in Tottori Prefecture
Tottori (city)
Museums established in 2000
2000 establishments in Japan